Kalala, is a 2006 Chadian documentary film directed and produced by Mahamat-Saleh Haroun. The film is a tribute to a friend of Haroun, Kalala alias Hissein Djibrine, as a reflection on memory and illness of his dearest friend who died due to Aids in 2003. 

The film made its premier on 20 August 2021. The film received mixed reviews from critics and screened in many film festivals.

References

External links 
 

Chadian documentary films
2006 films
2006 documentary films